Nina Olivette (8 August 1910 - 21 February 1971) was an American actress and dancer who was sometimes described as a "dancing comedienne".

Early years
Born in Manhattan, New York, Olivette was the daughter of Edgar and Kazia Prajinska Lachmann. Her father was a cigar manufacturer in his native Germany; in the United States, he became a vice-president in Charles M. Schwab's steel company. Her mother was a ballet dancer in her native Poland; after coming to the United States, she performed in vaudeville.

As a girl, Olivette joined her mother's troupe in ballet performances, but after a leg injury prevented her from maintaining the balance needed to be a ballerina, she turned to combining dancing with comedy.

Career

Entertainment
Olivette worked with Violet Carlson in a vaudeville act billed as the Lachmann Sisters. When she was 12, producers Jones and Green recruited her for one of their shows, taking her away from vaudeville.

On Broadway, Olivette appeared in Music Box Revue, Queen High, George White's Scandals, The Sweetest Little Devil, Captain Jinks, and  Hold Everything!

Much of Olivette's career was spent in comedic roles. Her first straight role came in Twin Beds (1954). She explained in 1930 that her routines were adaptations of existing dances rather than new creations. Starting with a dance such as the Black Bottom or Charleston, she said that she relaxed her muscles, "then [I] try to give the appearance of falling apart while performing it. The effect always seems to be funny."

Olivette's film debut came in Queen High (1930).

Designing
Olivette designed women's fashion accessories, including handbags, scarves, and stoles. Her products made her "a particularly favorite designer with stage people and television stars". She also was a designer for Your Show of Shows on television in the early 1950s.

Personal life 
Olivette was married to Harry Stockwell and was the stepmother of Dean Stockwell and Guy Stockwell.

Death 
On February 21, 1971, Olivette died at Polyclinic Hospital following a heart attack. She was 63.

References

External links

 

1910 births
1971 deaths
20th-century American actresses
American film actresses
American stage actresses
Vaudeville performers
American female dancers